Teddy Dupay was a basketball player. He played for coach Billy Donovan's Florida Gators men's basketball team, and had a career marred by injuries.

Dupay is one of the most decorated high school players in the history of Florida prep basketball. He set the scoring record at the time with 3,744 points at Mariner. Dupay won the 3-point contest at the 1998 McDonald's All-American Boys Game.

References

1979 births
Sportspeople from Fort Myers, Florida
Guards (basketball)
Basketball players from Florida
Florida Gators men's basketball players
Living people